Nesochoris holographa is a species of moth of the family Tortricidae. It is found in Chile's Juan Fernandez Islands.

The wingspan is 22 mm. The ground colour of the forewings is greyish, covered with short transverse dashes and small spots of the same colour. The hindwings are light reddish brown, but paler basally.

References

Moths described in 1965
Euliini
Endemic fauna of Chile